Waras is a mountainous district in the southern part of Bamyan province, Afghanistan. Its population is 76,398 people (2011), who are entirely Hazara, according to AIMS data. The main village is Waras (other forms of the name: Sewake Dahanwaras, Dahanwars, Sēwake Dahanwaras, Dahan Varas, Dahan Waras, Dahanwars).

Climate
Waras has a subarctic climate (Köppen: Dsc) with mild, dry summers and cold, snowy winters.

References

External links

 UNHCR District Profile
 AIMS District Map 

Hazarajat
Districts of Bamyan Province